A factor oracle is a finite state automaton that can efficiently search for factors (substrings) in a body of text.  Older techniques, such as suffix trees, were time-efficient but required significant amounts of memory.  Factor oracles, by contrast, can be constructed in linear time and space in an incremental fashion.

Overview 

Older techniques for matching strings include: suffix arrays, suffix trees, suffix automata or directed acyclic word graphs, and factor automata (Allauzen, Crochemore, Raffinot, 1999).  In 1999, Allauzen, Crochemore, and Raffinot, presented the factor oracle algorithm as a memory efficient improvement upon these older techniques for string matching and compression.  Starting in the mid-2000s, factor oracles have found application in computer music, as well.

Implementations 
The Computer Audition Laboratory provides a Matlab implementation of the factor oracle algorithm.

See also 

 Suffix array
 Generalised suffix tree

References

Automata (computation)
Substring indices